= Vodafone Direto =

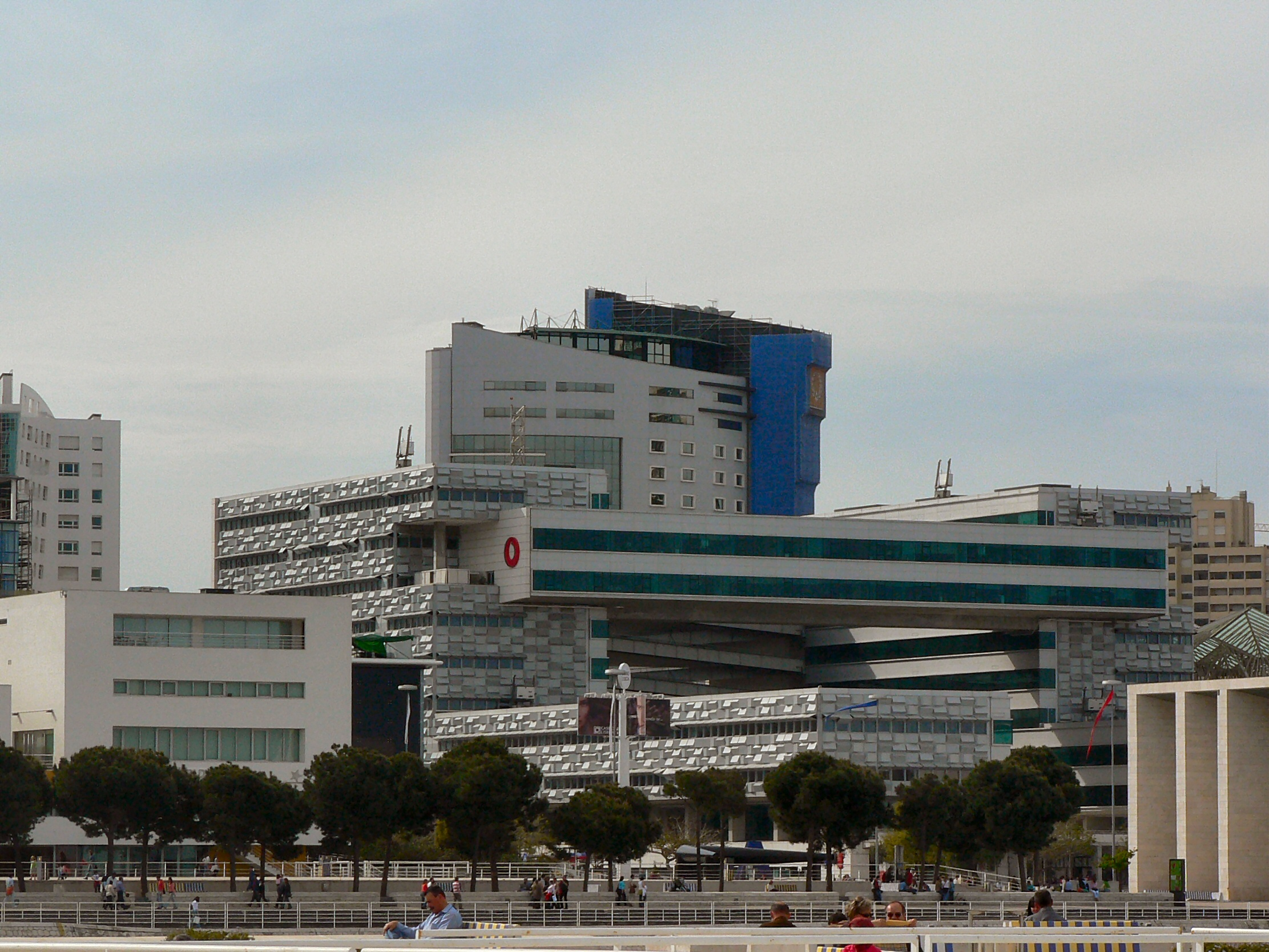

Vodafone Direto is a tariff brand, launched in 2005 in Portugal, over the network Vodafone.
